Brayan Jacobo Villalobos Gutiérrez (born 11 June 1998) is a Mexican professional footballer who plays as a forward for Tepatitlán de Morelos.

References

External links
 

1998 births
Living people
Mexican footballers
Association football forwards
Cafetaleros de Chiapas footballers
C.D. Tepatitlán de Morelos players
Ascenso MX players
Liga Premier de México players
Tercera División de México players
Footballers from Jalisco